John Edward Caiger (1939–2018), was a male boxer who competed for England.

Boxing career
He represented England in the -75 Kg division and won a bronze medal at the 1958 British Empire and Commonwealth Games in Cardiff, Wales.

He was the 1961 Amateur Boxing Association British middleweight champion, when boxing for the Army. He turned professional under Terry Lawless and later worked as the trainer for Fairburn House Boys Club in Canning Town.

References

1939 births
2018 deaths
English male boxers
Commonwealth Games medallists in boxing
Commonwealth Games bronze medallists for England
Boxers at the 1958 British Empire and Commonwealth Games
Light-middleweight boxers
Medallists at the 1958 British Empire and Commonwealth Games